The Sunni Ittehad Council, formed in 2009, is an alliance of  Islamic political and religious parties in Pakistan which represents followers of the Barelvi (Sufi) school of Sunni Islam. 

The current chairman of the main 'M' faction is Sayyid Mahfooz Shah Sahib Mashadi and member parties of the Sunni Ittehad Council include the Aalmi Tanzeem Ahle Sunnat of Pir Afzal Qadri (of Gujrat) and Jamiat Ulema-e-Pakistan. The Jamiat Ulema-e-Pakistan (JUP) was founded by Mohammad Abdul Ghafoor Hazarvi.

The breakaway 'F' faction that was established by Sahibzada Fazl Kareem and Haji Hanif Tayyab is now under the leadership of Hamid Raza.

Actions
In December 2011, the Sunni Ittehad Council launched a countrywide "Difa-e-Pakistan campaign" to create public awareness against NATO attacks on Pakistan’s border military posts in Mohmand Agency, and decided to hold a "Condemn America Day" on the 23rd of that month. Those NATO attacks killed over two dozens Pakistani soldiers.

With Sunni Ittehad Council's chairman, Sahibzada Fazal Kareem presiding, this decision was taken at an 'All Parties Confereence' of many parties of Ahle Sunnat school of thought.

The US government website Usaspending.gov shows that the Sunni Ittehad Council received $36,607 from Washington in 2009. Sunni Ittehad Council had organized anti-Taliban rallies in Pakistan in the past. But the council later demonstrated in support of Mumtaz Qadri who killed the liberal politician Salman Taseer for his criticism of anti-blasphemy laws in Pakistan. According to a Hudson Institute report, "A few days after the assassination, leading religious groups led a demonstration of over fifty thousand people in Karachi in support of the blasphemy law. During the rally, Qadri was lionized as a Muslim hero, while rally leaders sternly warned the crowds against mourning Taseer, whom they claimed had deviated from Islam."

In September 2011, the Council reacted to rumors that the United States might invade Pakistan in an attempt to put down terrorist networks in the country. The Council issued a fatwa stating that jihad against the US would become obligatory, were the country to encroach upon Pakistani soil, and urged the Pakistani government to prepare the nation for a holy war "in the way of God."

On 12 October 2012, a group of 50 Islamic clerics in Pakistan issued a fatwā against the Taliban gunmen who tried to kill Malala Yousafzai. Islamic scholars from the Sunni Ittehad Council publicly denounced attempts by the Pakistani Taliban to mount religious justifications for the shooting of Yousafzai and two of her classmates.

Division 
Due to some political divisions, the Sunni Ittehad Council broke into two. One faction, led by Sayyid Muhammad Mahfooz Shah Sahib of Bhikki Shareef, declared that Sahibzada Fazal e Kareem and Haji Hanif Tayyab had been removed from their positions due to attempting to create an alliance with the Pakistan Muslim League Q without the prior permission of the member parties of the Sunni Ittehad Council, along with a host of other allegations.

Sahibzada Fazal Kareem therefore established one group Sunni Ittehad Council-F while Sayyid Mahfzooz Shah  made another group called Sunni Ittehad Council-Mashadi. Fazal Kareem later died and the leadership of the Sunni Ittehad Council-F was given to Sahibzada Hamid Raza

References

External links 
  

2009 establishments in Pakistan
Islamic political parties in Pakistan
Sunni organizations
Islamic organisations based in Pakistan
Barelvi political parties
Political party alliances in Pakistan